Homer protein homolog 1 or Homer1 is a neuronal protein that in humans is encoded by the HOMER1 gene.  Other names are Vesl and PSD-Zip45.

Structure 

Homer1 protein has an N-terminal EVH1 domain, involved in protein interaction, and a C-terminal coiled-coil domain involved in self association.  It consists of two major splice variants, short-form (Homer1a) and long-form (Homer1b and c).  Homer1a has only EVH1 domain and is monomeric while Homer1b and 1c have both EVH1 and coiled-coil domains and are tetrameric.  The coiled-coil can be further separated into N-terminal half and C-terminal half.  The N-terminal half of the coiled-coil domain is predicted to be a parallel dimer while the C-terminus half is a hybrid of dimeric and anti-parallel tetrameric coiled-coil.  As a whole, long Homer is predicted to have a dumbbell-like structure where two pairs of EVH1 domains are located on two sides of long (~50 nm) coiled-coil domain.  Mammals have Homer2 and Homer3, in addition to Homer1, which have similar domain structure.  They also have similar alternatively spliced forms.

Tissue distribution 

Homer1 is expressed widely in the central nervous system as well as peripheral tissue including heart, kidney, ovary, testis, and skeletal muscle.  Subcellularly in neurons, Homer1 is concentrated in postsynaptic structures and constitutes a major part of the postsynaptic density.

Function 

EVH1 domain interacts with PPXXF motif.  This sequence motif exists in group 1 metabotrophic glutamate receptor (mGluR1 and mGluR5), IP3 receptors (IP3R), Shank, transient receptor potential canonical (TRPC) family channels, drebrin, oligophrenin, dynamin3, CENTG1, and ryanodin receptor.  Through its tetrameric structure, long forms of Homer (such as Homer1b and Homer1c) are proposed to cross link different proteins.  For example, group 1 mGluR is crossed linked with its signaling downstream, IP3 receptor.  Also, through crosslinking another multimeric protein Shank, it is proposed to comprise a core of the postsynaptic density.

Notably, the expression of Homer1a is induced by neuronal activity while that of Homer1b and 1c are constitutive.  Thus Homer1a is classified as an immediate early gene.  Homer1a, acts as a natural dominant negative form that blocks interaction between long-forms and their ligand proteins by competing with the EVH1 binding site on the ligand proteins.  In this way, the short form of Homer uncouples mGluR signaling and also shrinks dendritic spine structure.  Therefore, the short form of Homer is considered to be a part of a mechanism of homeostatic plasticity that dampens the neuronal responsiveness when input activity is too high. The long form Homer1c plays a role in synaptic plasticity and the stabilization of synaptic changes during long-term potentiation.

The coiled-coil domain is reported to interact with syntaxin13 and activated Cdc42.  The interaction with Cdc42 inhibit the activity of Cdc42 to remodel dendritic spine structure.

Rapid antidepressant effects 
Homer1a switches mGluR5 signaling to increase AMPA receptor activity for the rapid antidepressant actions of sleep deprivation.

See also 
 HOMER2
 HOMER3

References

Further reading 

 
 
 
 
 
 
 
 
 
 
 
 
 
 
 
 

EVH1 domain